Andrew de Kilkenny was Dean of Exeter between 1283 and 1302.

Notes

Deans of Exeter